Sandyford railway station served the town of Paisley, Renfrewshire, Scotland, from 1914 to 1967 on the Paisley and Renfrew Railway.

History 
The station opened as Sandyford Platform in 1914 by the Glasgow and South Western Railway. It was only available to the workers of Ogston and Tennant's Renfrew Mill, which had sidings to the east. There were more sidings to the south near Sandyford Signal Box, which opened in 1911 and closed in 1936. The station's name changed to Sandyford Halt in June 1952. It opened to the public on 18 April 1966, although it was Short-lived, closing a year later on 5 June 1967.

References

External links 
RAILSCOT - Sandyford Halt

Disused railway stations in Renfrewshire
Former Glasgow and South Western Railway stations
Railway stations in Great Britain opened in 1914
Railway stations in Great Britain closed in 1967
1914 establishments in Scotland
1967 disestablishments in Scotland